The 2005 Asian Judo Championships were held in Tashkent, Uzbekistan from 14 May to 15 May 2005.

Medal summary

Men

Women

Medal table

External links
 
 Result of the 2005 Asian Judo Championships (Judo Union of Asia)
 Results of the 2005 Asian Judo Championships (International Judo Federation)

Asian Championships
Asian Judo Championships
Asian Judo Championships
International sports competitions hosted by Uzbekistan
Sport in Tashkent
21st century in Tashkent
Asian